The Feddens are an English five-piece indie rock band from the Forest of Dean, Gloucestershire, England. The band consists of Peter Eason Daniels (synth, guitar, vocals), Joe Cairns (rhythm guitar, vocals), Joe Loughlin (lead guitar), Holly Weyman (bass) and Jack Cairns (drums).

The Feddens came to prominence after a small number of gigs in Gloucestershire. In 2012 they released their first two EPs "Smoke Signals" and "So Long, The Storm". A few of the songs on these EP's have been played on a number of radio stations and have had critical acclaim from a number of indie music reviewers.

In November 2012, they released a new demo single "Count Backwards". Shortly before the release of "Count Backwards", it was released that previous member Sean Walker (rhythm guitar) had left the band to form another Gloucestershire-based band, New Lake. He was replaced by Holly Weyman on bass and Joe Cairns moved to rhythm guitar.

Through Summer 2013, the band have released their new single "Semaphore". The band have also announced a number of Summer festivals where they are playing live including the Wychwood Festival in Cheltenham, Gloucestershire.

Influences
On the band's Facebook page they state that they were influenced by the Arctic Monkeys, Bombay Bicycle Club, Dog Is Dead, Two Door Cinema Club, Foals, The Cure, The Smiths and local Gloucestershire band Los Campesinos!

"Smoke Signals"
"Smoke Signals" was the Feddens first EP released on 13 February 2012.

"So Long, The Storm"
"So Long, The Storm" was the Feddens second EP released on 30 May 2012.

References 

English indie rock groups
People from Forest of Dean District
Musicians from Gloucestershire